
Gmina Skoroszyce is a rural gmina (administrative district) in Nysa County, Opole Voivodeship, in south-western Poland.

Villages
Gmina Skoroszyce contains the villages and settlements of Brzeziny, Chróścina, Czarnolas, Giełczyce, Makowice, Mroczkowa, Pniewie, Sidzina, Skoroszyce and Stary Grodków.

Neighbouring gminas
Gmina Skoroszyce is bordered by the gminas of Grodków, Łambinowice, Niemodlin and Pakosławice.

References

Skoroszyce
Nysa County